The Littlejohn's toadlet (Uperoleia littlejohni) is a species of frog in the family Myobatrachidae.
It is endemic to Australia.
Its natural habitats are dry savanna, moist savanna, subtropical or tropical dry shrubland, subtropical or tropical dry lowland grassland, subtropical or tropical seasonally wet or flooded lowland grassland, intermittent freshwater lakes, and intermittent freshwater marshes.

References

Uperoleia
Amphibians of Queensland
Taxonomy articles created by Polbot
Amphibians described in 1986
Frogs of Australia